Michael Andersson is a Cook Islander former professional rugby league footballer who played in the 2000s.

International honours
Michael Andersson won caps for Cook Islands in the 2000 Rugby League World Cup.

References

External links
Kiwis looking for second win

Cook Islands national rugby league team players
Cook Island rugby league players
Living people
Place of birth missing (living people)
Year of birth missing (living people)
Rugby league halfbacks